Romain Ruffenach (born 4 September 1994) is a French Rugby Union player. His position is Hooker and he currently plays for French side  in the Top 14 competition.

References

External links
Romain Ruffenach on itsrugby.co.uk.

Montpellier Hérault Rugby players
French rugby union players
Biarritz Olympique players
1994 births
Living people
Rugby union hookers